Kachiguda is one of the old suburbs in Hyderabad, Telangana, India. The third largest railway station in Hyderabad, Kacheguda railway station, built during the Nizam rule, is a major landmark of Kachiguda.

History 
The name was derived from the Kachhi community, which still has a sizeable population near the Kacheguda railway station.

Locality 
Kachiguda business activities include textiles, ready-made garments, and footwear for economical buyers.

This locality also has a cinema hub with cinema theaters like INOX Kachiguda (Multiplex), Venkatramana 70mm, Padmavati 35mm, Tarakrama 70mm and Kumar 70mm.

Reliance Trends and Reliance Digital outlets are also located in Kachiguda.

There is also a hotel, Tourist Plaza Hotel, which was recently rebuilt. The locality also has various other hotels and restaurants.

There is a Shri Khatu Shyam Baba temple where khatu shyam(barbarika) is worshipped as lord krishna, and this temple is popularly known as veeranna gutta as the self arisen idol of lord veerabadra was found first in the temple, which is located in front of the railway station, providing services such as free physiotherapy, free food to poor people at lunch time, and daily prasad offered to all devotees who come for darshan of Shri Shyam Baba.

Kachiguda is the hub of the Marwadi, Jain, Gujarati and Telugu communities. There is a Jain temple (Shri Acchalgach Jain Mandir) adjacent to the Bank of India for Jains and Gujaratis.

Kachiguda Mahakali Mandir is famous for Ugadi, Bonalu, Vijayadashami and Deepawali festivals.
Kachiguda also has the second biggest Lord Shri Ganesh Idol in Chappal Bazar during Ganesh Festival and also for Bonalu Festival in the twin cities of Hyderabad and Secunderabad.

There is a lord Ganesha Temple where people from different places come to take the blessings.

Kachiguda also has a mosque, Masjid Shah Miyan.

Transport 

Kacheguda railway station is a very important railway station, and its significance is growing, as trains from northern India to southern India pass through Kachiguda Railway Station.

Kachiguda is connected by buses run by TSRTC. Since a bus depot is located here, it is well connected to other cities. 89 bus services operate. The MMTS train service is operates at the Kacheguda railway station, connecting it to major parts of the Hyderabad.

Education 
There are several educational institutions located in Kachiguda:
 Nrupatunga educational Institutions
Badruka educational Institutions
 RG Kedia College of Commerce
 St. Francis Junior College
 Haindavi Degree College
 Deeksha model school

Hospitals 
Sri Venkatesh Borgoankar Nursing Home
Sri Sai Krishna Neuro Hospital
Shalini Children's Hospital
C. C. Shroff Hospital
Bristlecone Hospital
Prathima Hospital

References 

Neighbourhoods in Hyderabad, India